Béla Von Kehrling was the reigning champion but was defeated by Roderich Menzel 4–6, 6–3, 6–4, 6–1 who won his first Hungarian International Tennis Championships.

Seeds
The third and fourth seeds had to play a play-off pre-match into the first round.

Draw

Finals

Top half

Section 1

Section 2

Bottom half

Section 3

Section 4

References

Hungarian International Tennis Championships - Men's Singles